Li Guizhen  p Lǐ Guìzhēn; 1907–1942), better known by her stage name Bai Yushuang   Yùshuāng,  Jade Frost"), was a Chinese Ping Opera singer and actress. She was one of "The Four Famous Dans"  Sì Dàmíng Dàn) and remains known as the "Queen of Pingju"   Píngjù Huánghòu).

Life
Li Guizhen was born in Guye, Luan County, Hebei. As a child, she was sold to the wandering entertainer Li Jingchun and his wife Mrs Bian, who renamed her Li Huimin  Lǐ Huìmǐn). Her status within the family was reduced when Mrs Bian gave birth to a son, Li Guozhang. She was then forced to earn money on the street by singing stories accompanied by a small drum or other instrument. At fourteen, she began learning pingju from Dong Faliang, taking supporting roles under the stage name "Bai Yushuang". She became celebrated in Beiping (now Beijing) and Tianjin for her extreme range, from very high notes to lower than lowest note of the erhu. Upon Li Jingchun's death, his widow Mrs Bian purchased more girls from poor families. The 4-year-old Xiaodezi was renamed Fuzi and instructed to refer to Li Guizhen as her mother.

Bai Yushuang began to perform lead roles for the Yushun Opera Troupe. This company was owned by Mrs Bian, managed by her brother, and accompanied by her son on the erhu, a situation which led to its being generally known as the Li Troupe (Lijia Ban). Bai Yushuang eventually changed its name to the North China Opera Troupe   Huáběi Xìshè). She became notorious as a "slutty performer" (yínlíng) and "contaminant" following her performance as a fly spirit in the 1933 Catching Flies   Zhuō Cāngying), when her costume consisted of a red dudou and tight white clothes under some long scarves, and was expelled from Beiping by its mayor for performing "obscene lyrics". The Chinese periodical Women's Lives reported icily that "thousands of square miles of Chinese territory have been occupied by the Japanese without any resistance, but if a woman offends public decency, she must be expelled."

Relocating to Shanghai in 1935, Li Guizhen performed pingju alongside Ai Lianjun, Yu Lingzhi, and Zhao Ruquan to large audiences at the Enpaiya Theater and on tour through Suzhou, Wuxi, and Nanjing. The repertoire included Pan Jinlian, Spring in the Jade Hall (Yù Táng Chūn), The Little Matchmaker   Hóngniáng), Yan Poxi, and The Lioness's Roar   Hédōng Shīhǒu). She was arrested and accused of murder but Mrs Bian was able to extricate her from the charges. Her character was attacked by conservatives but defended by Zhao Jinshen and A Ying in the press and the reformers Tian Han, Hong Shen, and Ouyang Yuqian worked with her to work "anti-feudalist" messages into her historical dramas. She became a movie star following her role in Zhang Shichuan's 1936 Red Begonia   Hǎitáng Hóng) and was considered one of "The Four Famous Dans", alongside Liu Cuixia, Ai Lianjun, and Xi Cailian.

She fell in love with the cymbal player Li Yongqi, but Mrs Bian prevented their marriage to protect the profits she was deriving from her "money tree" (yaoqianshu). The pair eloped to his hometown in Ba County, Hebei, in February 1937. She dressed and lived as a peasant for six months before Mrs Bian ultimately negotiated for her return and the troupe's return to Tianjin and Beiping. Around the time of the Japanese occupation of the city, Bai Yushuang was diagnosed with uterine cancer. She received treatment at Beiping's German hospital and her understudy Fuzi—under the name Little Bai Yushuang   Bái Yùshuāng)—only replaced her once she was too ill to take the stage. In Spring of 1942, Li Guizhen returned to Tianjin to find that her bank accounts and property had been transferred to Mrs Bian's son. She collapsed on stage during a performance of Understanding after Death   Sǐ Hòu Míngbai) with Li Yifen in July 1942 and subsequently died.

See also
 Pingju
 Chinese opera

Notes

References

Citations

Bibliography
 .
 .
 .

External links
 "白玉霜" on Baike.com 
 Historical Advertising Archive at the Nanjing Library , including three ads by Bai Yushuang in the 1920s and '30s
 Gallery of images of Bai Yushuang 

Ping opera actresses
People from Luanzhou
Actresses from Hebei
Singers from Hebei
1907 births
1942 deaths
20th-century Chinese women singers
20th-century Chinese actresses